Silverton is a city in Marion County, Oregon, United States. The city is named after Silver Creek, which flows through the town from Silver Falls into the Pudding River, and thence into the Willamette River. The community of Milford was founded in 1846 with a sawmill, store and several other buildings two miles upstream from the present location of Silverton. In about 1853 a second sawmill was built on Silver Creek near where the Silverton city hall now stands. In 1854 the town of Silverton was platted and registered with Marion County. Human habitation of the Silverton area extends back approximately 6,000 years before the present. In historical times, the region was dominated by the Kalapuya and Molala peoples, whose seasonal burns of the area made it plow-ready and attractive to early 19th century Euro-American settlers. Farming was Silverton's first major industry, and has been a dominant land-use activity in and around Silverton since the mid-19th century.

Silverton is part of the Salem Metropolitan Statistical Area, and the population core of the Silver Falls School District. The population was 10,484 at the time of the 2020 census.

Geography

Silverton is situated on the eastern edge of the Willamette Valley, a fertile and alluvial plain which stretches from the western foothills of the Cascade Range on the east, known as the Waldo Hills, to the eastern foothills of the Oregon Coast Range on the west. Silverton lies on either side of Silver Creek, a tributary of the Pudding River, which joins the Molalla River before emptying into the northward-flowing Willamette River. Abiqua Creek also empties into the Pudding River; it flows across the eastern valley north of Silverton, further draining the land around the city.

The agricultural richness of the environs is due to massive and repeated floods from prehistoric Lake Missoula in western Montana.

Until the mid-19th century, the Silverton area was a broad, open grassland with small stands of Oregon white oak, ponderosa pine and Douglas fir. Stands of Oregon white oak, red alder, big leaf maple, and black cottonwood lined streams and river banks. While these tree species are extant today, widespread farming in the Willamette Valley between 1850 and 1870 altered the land through the discontinuation of widespread seasonal burning in the valley plains previously employed by the Kalapuya people. Large stands of Douglas fir and western red cedar, mixed with Oregon white oak, remain in the Silverton area, especially on eastern ridge tops and on the slopes of the Waldo Hills to the south. Due to decades of intensive timber extraction, mature second- and third-growth trees comprise existing evergreen stands.

Climate
This region experiences warm (with occasional hot spells) and dry summers, but with no average monthly temperatures above .  According to the Köppen Climate Classification system, Silverton has a warm-summer Mediterranean climate, abbreviated "Csb" on climate maps. The climate is relatively mild, considering Silverton's northern latitude, and temperature fluctuations are generally small. Precipitation, primarily in the form of fall and winter rain, ranges between  annually. Silverton's climate and its soil have made the area well suited for a variety of crops and for livestock grazing.

Demographics

2010 census

As of the census of 2010, there were 9,222 people, 3,452 households, and 2,442 families residing in Silverton. There were 3,477 housing units, 18.1% of which were housing units in multi-unit structures. The homeownership rate was 64.3% and the median value of owner-occupied housing units was $229,700. The racial makeup of the city was 84.1% White, 12.7% Hispanic or Latino of any race, 1.7% from other races, 1.0% Asian, 0.7% Native American, 0.2% African American, and 0.1% Pacific Islander.

Of the 3,452 households in Silverton, 34.6% had children under the age of 18 living with them. 54% were married couples living together, 12.6% had a female householder with no husband present, 4.1% had a male householder with no wife present, and 29.3% were non-families. 24.3% of all households were made up of individuals, and 25.2% had someone living alone who was 65 years of age or older. The average household size was 2.65 and the average family size was 3.15.

The median age in Silverton was 35.8 years. 28.4% of residents were under the age of 18; 17.2% were 62 years of age or older. Silverton's gender makeup was 47.6% male and 52.4% female. 91.7% were high school graduates, and 29.1% held bachelor's or higher degrees. The median household income was $51,687. 16.1% of the population lived at or below the poverty level.

2000 census

As of the census of 2000, there were 7,414 people, 3,452 households, and 
2,442 families residing in Silverton. Silverton's homeownership rate was 60.7%, while 39.9% of occupied housing units were rented. The median value of owner-occupied housing units was $148,800. The racial makeup of Silverton was 89.4% White, 11.6% Hispanic or Latino of any race, 1.09% Native American, 0.43% Asian, 0.21% African American, and 8.83% other races. 

The median age in Silverton was 33 (31 for males and 35 for females). 37.7% were under the age of 18, 13.4% were 65 years of age or older, 47% were male and 53% female. Of the population 25 years of age and older, 7.1% possessed a graduate or professional degree, 15.3% held a bachelor's degree, 5.2% held an associate degree, 28% had some college education but no degree, while an additional 28.8% had graduated from high school or its equivalent but had not received any college education. 15.6% failed to complete high school.

The median salary for a male was $34,707 while the median for a female was $24,479. Major employers in Silverton in 2000 included the Silver Falls School District (400+ employees), Silverton Hospital (402), Champion Homes (200+), Brucepac (100+), and Mallorie's Dairy (90). The median household income was $38,429. 11.7% of Silverton households earned less than $10,000 per year, while 2.5% earned $150,000 or more. About 10.4% of families and 13.0% of the population were below the poverty line, including 18.7% of those under age 18 and 6.0% of those age 65 or over.

Education

Silverton is the population core of the Silver Falls School District, which, in addition to Silverton, serves nearby Scotts Mills in as well as communities in the surrounding foothills up to Silver Falls State Park. Currently there are twelve elementary schools in the district, and the campus of Silverton High School on Pine Street, which was completed in 2009. Voters passed a bond levy in 1994 for construction of a new high school to be completed in two phases. The first phase of the new high school was completed in 1997, with a capacity for 500 students.  The second phase was not completed until the summer of 2009, after voters passed a new bond levy in November 2006. In autumn 2009, students at the high school's old campus moved into the new campus at 802 Schlador Street. As of October 2014, the School District was seeking proposals from architectural firms for completion of the Middle School Schlador Campus Reconstruction in Silverton.

In 2006, Silverton and Silver Falls School District  formed a partnership to support, maintain, and operate Silverton's local access cable channel, SCAN-TV.

In 2014, Silverton High School's enrolled students numbered 1,196. Of those students, 39% were judged to be economically disadvantaged. 36.9% were entitled to receive a free or reduced-rate lunch. 14% of the student population were disabled, 11% were English language learners. Compared to other similar high schools, Silverton High School students' scholastic achievements rated above average. The racial makeup of the school was 81.7% White, 14.5% Hispanic, 0.9% African-American, 0.6% Native American, 0.5% Asian. 1.9% were Other/Unknown.

History
The first white settlers arrived at Silver Creek in the 1800s. Two settlers, James Smith and John Barger created a sawmill along the creek in 1846. The town was originally known as Milford. In 1854, the town was abandoned and the settlers moved downstream to the current spot of Silverton. The town was first known as Silver Creek but the name was changed a year later. The town expanded and grew and was incorporated in 1885. The town now housed about 229 people. The town continued to grow until now, where it now has over 10,000 people.

Killing of Andrew Hanlon
In June 2008, Silverton came to international attention when an unarmed Irish citizen, Andrew James (AJ) Hanlon, aged 20, was killed by a police officer, Tony Gonzalez, in controversial circumstances. Gonzalez, who was responding to a reported disturbance of the peace, shot the unarmed Hanlon five times, although Hanlon's sister recalled seeing seven bullets in her brother's body.
 
The death, which Hanlon's sister described as the only shooting in Silverton in the past twenty years, was greeted with shock there as well as in Ireland, particularly when it emerged that Hanlon had been experiencing psychological issues and had most probably gotten lost on his way home to his sister's house in Silverton. Complaints were made by Hanlon's family that it took six hours for the police to inform his sister of her brother's death, despite her living only a mile away, and questions were asked why the police had not used a tazer, which was available to them. Requests for transparency were greeted by obfuscation and secrecy and claims that, in Andrew Hanlon's mother's words, the city's establishment "had closed ranks on" the Hanlon family to protect Gonzalez. while the Consulate in San Francisco of the Government of Ireland registered concern over the killing. Protests outside Silverton City Hall were also ignored. On 24 July 2008, a Marion County grand jury found that because Gonzalez had testified that he believed that Andrew James Hanlon was armed, his killing was justified. Eight days later, on August 1, 2008, and just over a month after Andrew was killed on the 30th of June, Gonzalez resigned from Silverton's police department. He had been arrested in July and charged with child abuse. On December 7, 2008, Gonzalez was sentenced to 6 years and 3 months imprisonment when he pleaded guilty to sexually abusing a teenage girl.

Points of interest 

 Silverton is the gateway to Silver Falls State Park, Oregon's largest state park. Town Square Park in downtown is a small park with a footbridge crossing Silverton Creek and a war memorial.
 The Oregon Garden, an  botanical park, is in Silverton.
 Shrine of Bobbie the Wonder Dog replica of Bobbie and his 1920s era doghouse 
 Gordon House, located on the grounds of Silverton's Oregon Garden, is the only house in the Pacific Northwest designed by Frank Lloyd Wright which is open to the public. Gordon House was one of the last of Lloyd Wright's famed Usonian designs.
 Silverton has a number of outsized murals, including Norman Rockwell's The Four Freedoms originally painted on the side of a building located at 402 Main Street in Silverton, and visible from Second Street In 2015, the original building was razed and, after abandoning hopes to salvage them, the murals were destroyed during demolition. However, community efforts replaced them with a new replica at 990 N. First St.
 Every August, the Homer Davenport Community Festival celebrates Silverton's most famous citizen—writer, political cartoonist, and Arabian horse breeder Homer Davenport (1867–1912)—with exhibits, entertainment, an arts and crafts fair, rides, races, contests, a cartooning competition, a party, and a parade.
 The Palace Theater in Silverton's Commercial Historic District is a movie theater constructed in the early 1900s. Originally called the Opera House, it has been showing motion pictures to the public since at least 1909. The Palace Theater has survived two fires, one in 1935 that destroyed a large portion of downtown, and the other in April 2012. The 2012 fire was mostly limited to the concession area, although the smoke damage was extensive and caused at least one other business to temporarily close. The theater was later co-owned by the former mayor, Stu Rasmussen, the first openly transgender mayor in the United States.

Notable people

 Greg Craven, climate change activist who produced a viral video on YouTube
Homer Davenport, political cartoonist
Scott Gragg, NFL tackle
Bill Grier, college basketball coach, formerly head coach at University of San Diego
Donald Pettit, astronaut
Stu Rasmussen, first openly transgender mayor in the United States

Media
The Appeal
 The first bank robbery and chase scene in the movie Bandits was filmed in Silverton.

References
Notes

Sources

External links

Entry for Silverton in the Oregon Blue Book
Silverton Chamber of Commerce

 
1854 establishments in Oregon Territory
Cities in Marion County, Oregon
Cities in Oregon
Populated places established in 1854
Salem, Oregon metropolitan area